United Bulgarian Bank (UBB) is one of the leading Bulgarian commercial banks. It is the first and largest banking consolidation project in Bulgaria, accomplished through the merger of 22 state-owned commercial banks throughout the country. UBB was established on 30 September 1992. The Bank manages assets, worth approximately BGN 6.6 billion and renders services to its clients via nearly 200 branches and banking structures throughout the country. The core business of UBB is being supported through the activity of its subsidiaries, UBB Asset Management, UBB Factoring and UBB Insurance Broker.

History
United Bulgarian Bank is the first large-scale project for banking consolidation in Bulgaria. It was founded on 30 September 1992 through the merger of 22 regional state-owned banks – Botevgradska Commercial Bank AD, Vrachanska Commercial Bank AD, Gabrovska Commercial Bank AD, Commercial Bank Doverie AD, Commercial Bank Elhovo AD, Commercial Bank Iskar AD, Kardzhaliyska Commercial Bank AD, Loveshka Commercial Bank AD, Mihaylovgradska Commercial Bank AD, Novozagorska Commercial Bank AD, Pazardzhishka Commercial Bank AD, Pernishka Commercial Bank AD, Peshterska Commercial Bank AD, Plevenska Commercial Bank AD, Popovska Commercial Bank AD, Rusenska Commercial Bank AD, Samokovska Commercial Bank AD, Slivenska Commercial Bank AD, Commercial Bank Stroybank AD, Targovishtka Commercial Bank AD, Haskovska Commercial Bank AD and Shumenska Commercial Bank.

In 1997 UBB was acquired by a consortium of the European Bank for Reconstruction and Development (EBRD), BULBANK and Oppenheimer financial company, thus becoming the first privatised state-owned bank in Bulgaria.

On 20 July 2000, BULBANK AD, CIBC World Markets  (former Oppenheimer Corp.), Jodrell Enterprises and the European Bank for Reconstruction and Development sold to the National Bank of Greece (NBG) a total of 68 289 905 shares, a deal that rendered the NBG majority shareholder of UBB with 89,9% share participation, while the European Bank for Reconstruction and Development retained a 10% share.

In turn, in 2002 the European Bank for Reconstruction and Development sold to the National Bank of Greece its 10% share, retained by that moment, thus rendering the National Bank of Greece majority shareholder with a share of 99.9%. The new owner preserved the Bank’s name and activity, while continuing its development as a universal market player.

In December 2016 KBC Group announced the purchase of United Bulgarian Bank and Interlease for 610 Million Euros. This would effectively make KBC the largest bank-insurance group in the country. The CIBANK banks would be renamed United Bulgarian Bank.

Banking Licence 
UBB holds full banking licence for performing banking and financial operations in Bulgaria and abroad.

Capital 
Total capital: BGN 1 164 878 thousand on an individual basis and BGN 1 170 937 thousand on a consolidated basis (as of 31 December 2014).

Registered share capital: BGN 75 964 082 (as of 31 December 2014).

UBB share capital is allocated into 75 964 082 ordinary registered voting shares, of nominal value BGN 1.00 each.

Shareholders

Majority Shareholder 
As of Y2014 the majority shareholder of United Bulgarian Bank is the National Bank of Greece with 99.9% share participation.

The National Bank of Greece is the oldest Greek bank that owns and runs the largest and the strongest financial group in the Republic of Greece. NBG Group offers a wide range of financial products and services that meet the ever changing needs of businesses and individuals. With 529 branches in Greece, 1,409 ATMs and 1222 branches abroad, NBG Group has the largest distribution network of financial products and services in Greece. Practically, it operates in 12 countries worldwide and controls 9 banks and 64 other companies with a total workforce of 34 539 employees. Through the acquisition of United Bulgarian Bank (Y2000), Stopanska Banka AD Skopje, Macedonia (Y2000), Banca Romaneasca S.A., Romania (Y2003), Finansbank, Turkey (Y2006) and Vojvodanska Banka, Serbia (Y2006) the National Bank of Greece affirmed its top position of a banking group in a market of 125 million people.

Market position 
(as of December 31, 2014)

  Fourth in terms of assets (7.72%)
 Third in terms of corporate banking and retail banking
 Over 1.5 million consumer accounts
 53 000 corporate accounts
 The most effectively operating bank on the Bulgarian market with cost income ratio of 43.2%
 The most advanced bank in terms of internal restructuring and implementation of the most successful banking practices and standards in all key areas.

The most modern and innovative Bulgarian bank with:
 A comprehensive corporate banking system and a system for real-time retail banking
 A leading position in the E-banking sphere (Internet banking, telephone banking, mobile banking)
 A leading position in new products’ implementation.

Market share 
(as of December 31, 2014, calculated on the grounds of BNB statistical data for the entire banking system):

Branch network 
 The best and most effective branch network
 Nearly 200 bank branches throughout Bulgaria, located in cities and towns of economic potential
 The branch network provides comprehensive real time service.
Branch Network Coverage

UBB branch network covers the following locations:
 Aytos
 Asenovgrad
 Bansko
 Batak
 Belene
 Belovo
 Belogradchik
 Berkovitsa
 Blagoevgrad
 Botevgrad
 Burgas
 Byala
 Byala Slatina
 Varna
 Veliki Preslav
 Veliko Tarnovo
 Velingrad
 Vidin
 Vratsa
 Varshets
 Gabrovo
 Gorna Oryahovitsa
 Gotse Delchev
 Dve Mogili
 Dimitrovgrad
 Dobrich
 Dryanovo
 Dulovo
 Dupnitsa
 Elin Pelin
 Elhovo
 Ivaylovgrad
 Isperih
 Ihtiman
 Kazanlak
 Karlovo
 Karnobat
 Kaspichan
 Kozloduy
 Kostinbrod
 Kula
 Kardzhali
 Kyustendil
 Levski
 Lovech
 Lom
 Lyubimets
 Mezdra
 Momchilgrad
 Montana
 Nesebar
 Nova Zagora
 Novi pazar
 Omurtag
 Oryahovo
 Pavlikeni
 Pazardzhik
 Panagyurishte
 Pernik
 Petrich
 Peshtera
 Pirdop
 Pleven
 Plovdiv
 Pomorie
 Popovo
 Primorsko
 Radnevo
 Radomir
 Razgrad
 Razlog
 Rakovski
 Ruse
 Samokov
 Sandanski
 Svilengrad
 Svishtov
 Svoge
 Sevlievo
 Silistra
 Sliven
 Smolyan
 Sozopol
 Sofia
 Stara Zagora
 Teteven
 Troyan
 Tryavna
 Targovishte
 Harmanli
 Haskovo
 Cherven Bryag
 Chirpan
 Shumen
 Yambol

Correspondent Relations 
UBB has established correspondent relations with 849 banks in 91 countries, as well as with 31 banks and foreign branches of financial institutions in Bulgaria. UBB maintains 23 correspondent accounts in twelve currencies.

See also
 List of banks in Bulgaria

References

External links
 
 National Bank of Greece website

Banks of Bulgaria